Vejle Stadium is a fully enclosed, modern (built in 2008) football stadium in Vejle, Denmark and is home ground of Vejle Boldklub. The stadium has two towers for business and two VIP lounges. The stadium holds 11,060 spectators and the field is equipped with sprinkler and undersoil heating systems.

References

External links
Official website
Vejle Stadion Nordic Stadiums

Football venues in Denmark
Buildings and structures in Vejle Municipality
Sports venues in the Region of Southern Denmark
Vejle Boldklub
Vejle